The 2017–18 Prva A Liga, known as Erste košarkaške lige by sponsorship reasons, is the 12th season of the Montenegrin Basketball League, the top tier basketball league on Montenegro. Budućnost VOLI, who until this season won all the league editions, lost the title to Mornar.

Competition format
Nine of the eleven teams that play the league join the regular season and play a two-round robin competition where the six first qualified teams join the Super Liga with the two 2017–18 ABA League teams (Budućnost Voli and Mornar). The last qualified team would play a relegation playoff against the second qualified of the Prva B.

Regular season

Super Liga

Playoffs

Relegation playoffs

|}

References

External links
Montenegrin Basketball Federation official website

Prva A liga seasons
Montenegro
Prva A liga